Denmark–Korea relations may refer to:

 Denmark–North Korea relations
 Denmark–South Korea relations